Vladimír Pláteník (born February 18, 1976) is a tennis coach and former professional tennis player from Slovakia. Pláteník is currently a head coach at the international EMPIRE Tennis Academy in Trnava, Slovakia where he worked with Daria Kasatkina from Russia.

He is the former coach of Dominika Cibulková, the 2014 Australian Open finalist. Pláteník was coaching her from 2007 to 2009 when she reached the semifinals of the French Open in 2009. In the quarterfinals, she defeated Maria Sharapova 6–0, 6–2. On July 6, 2009, she has reached No. 12 in the WTA rankings.

He was also the coach of Anna Blinkova. He now coaches Veronika Kudermetova.

A native of Bratislava, he is the vice president of the Professional Tennis Coaches Association for Slavic countries and a PTCA-certified coach.

Junior Grand Slam finals

Doubles: 1 (1 runner-up)

ATP Challenger and ITF Futures finals

Singles: 1 (1–0)

Doubles: 9 (4–5)

References

External links
 
 

1976 births
Living people
Slovak male tennis players
Slovak tennis coaches
Tennis players from Bratislava